Schmiedeberg is a village and a former municipality in the Sächsische Schweiz-Osterzgebirge district, in Saxony, Germany. It is situated in the valley of the river Rote Weißeritz, 24 km south of Dresden. Since 1 January 2014, it is part of the town Dippoldiswalde.

References 

Villages in the Ore Mountains
Former municipalities in Saxony